Vadamalapeta mandal is one of the 34 mandals in Tirupati district of Andhra Pradesh in India. It has its headquarters at Vadamalapeta village and is part of Tirupati revenue division.

History 
The mandal was a part of Chittoor district and was made part of the newly formed Tirupati district on 4 April 2022 as part of district reorganisation.

References

Mandals in Tirupati district